Nicasio Reservoir is a shallow, artificial reservoir in the Nicasio Valley region of Marin County, California, United States. It was created by the construction of Seeger Dam on the Nicasio Creek in 1961.

Controversy
The construction in the dam aroused much controversy among longtime residents of the area. The Water District forced the displacement of many farms, including the McIsaac family farm and the Tomasini Ranch, on which the majority of the reservoir sits.  The controversy stems from the fact the water from the reservoir is rarely used by the Water District, that the broad and shallow nature of the reservoir leads to quick evaporation, and that the dam has blocked valuable spawning areas for endangered coho salmon and threatened steelhead trout. Construction of Seeger Dam wiped out the salmon population in Nicasio Creek. The District briefly attempted to trap salmon below the dam and transport them by truck further up Nicasio Creek and Halleck Creek.  However, the effort proved unsuccessful.

Ecology
A river otter (Lontra canadensis) was collected by the Museum of Vertebrate Zoology at the southwest corner of Nicasio Reservoir in January, 2008.

Recreational uses
The reservoir is used for recreational purposes; mainly fishing and hiking. Largemouth bass, carp and catfish are caught in the lake. There are problems with illegal poaching.

The California Office of Environmental Health Hazard Assessment (OEHHA) has developed a safe eating advisory for fish caught in Nicasio Reservoir based on levels of mercury or PCBs found in the fish species.

See also
List of lakes in California
List of lakes in the San Francisco Bay Area

References

Reservoirs in Marin County, California
West Marin
Reservoirs in California
Reservoirs in Northern California